The Bogan Gate-to-Tottenham railway line is a railway line in New South Wales, Australia. It starts at the Bogan Gate junction on the transcontinental railway line and terminates at the town of Tottenham, New South Wales, near the geographic centre of that state. Although stations were built on the line, all have been closed, and it is now solely a goods line.

Stations

See also 
 Tottenham railway station, Melbourne, Australia
 Tottenham Hale station, London, England

References 

Regional railway lines in New South Wales
Standard gauge railways in Australia
1916 establishments in Australia
Railway lines opened in 1916